The Dallas Express was an American soccer club based in Dallas, Texas that was a member of the Lone Star Soccer Alliance.

The team began its existence as the Dallas Mean Green, a local, unaffiliated team which competed at the amateur level.  In 1984, it won the National Amateur Cup.  In 1987, The Mean Green entered the Lone Star Soccer Alliance under the name Dallas Express. They resumed their original name the next season, but in 1989, became known as F.C. Dallas. In their final season, the team was known as Dallas Inter.

Year-by-year

References

Defunct soccer clubs in Texas
Lone Star Soccer Alliance teams
Inter
1992 disestablishments in Texas
Association football clubs disestablished in 1992